1000 Tiny Claws is an action game developed and published by Mediatonic for PlayStation Portable in 2011.

Gameplay
The player takes control of Rana, the first mate of sky pirate Captain Bluebell, who has removed a magical sword and accidentally released a curse plaguing the world with insects. With Captain Bluebell and his crew arrested and sentenced to hang, Rana has only 24 hours to remove the curse by returning the pilfered sword to its rightful place.

The game consists of five regions made up each of five islands, and the player is tasked with fighting off each insect swarm that will attempt to knock them off the island. When the player hits an enemy, they get knocked back, and the more the enemies get hit, the further they fly, until they get knocked off the island. If the player gets hit, they will get knocked further and further with each hit. Eating an apple that bugs drop when they get knocked off will restore the player's defense, making it harder for the insects to fly off the island. If the player gets knocked off completely, the game is over and they are given an option to try again.

Development

Reception

The game received "generally favorable reviews" according to the review aggregation website Metacritic. Pocket Gamer said of the game, "It's a pity that the quality of swordplay at higher levels doesn't quite match up to the polished piratical trimmings of this snappily designed little number, leaving a considerable - but never quite deal-breaking - blemish on an otherwise charming downloadable fighter." Push Square said that the game "doesn't quite live up to the pedigree of Mediatonic's previous PlayStation Minis, with the quality of the swordplay in the game's concluding third detracting from the experience. But issues aside, this is still a delightfully conceived piratical package with a great sense of humour, and thus entirely worthy of your time." However, PlayStation Official Magazine – UK said, "Sometimes you'll want to hit yourself hard in the head with your controller, just to break up the monotony."

References

External links
 

2011 video games
Action video games
Indie video games
PlayStation Portable games
PlayStation Portable-only games
Video games about curses
Video games about insects
Video games about pirates
Video games developed in the United Kingdom
Single-player video games